, better known as , is a Japanese enka singer and actress represented by Suisei Kikaku.

Discography (singles)

Discography (albums)

Original albums

Live albums

Best albums

Filmography

NHK Kōhaku Uta Gassen

Drama

TV series

Honours
Order of the Rising Sun, 4th Class, Gold Rays with Rosette (2019)

References

External links
 

Japanese women singers
Japanese actresses
1945 births
Living people
Musicians from Kumamoto Prefecture
Recipients of the Order of the Rising Sun, 4th class